Negai (Japanese 願い "wish") may refer to:

Music
"Negai" (ja), song by Kōzō Murashita 1986
"Negai" (ja), song by  Masatoshi Nakamura 1990
Negai (B'z song) 1995
Negai (Fayray song) 2004
Negai (Rythem song) 2006
"Negai", song by mihimaru GT 
"Negai", song by Kumiko (singer)
"Negai", song by Masafumi Akikawa
"Negai", song by Teruhiko Saigo cover of the same song by Kotaro Satomi
"Negai", song by TiA
Wish Negai (ja), album by Oyunaa

Other
Negai (satellite)
Negai, Japanese adult visual game by Ram (company)

See also
Andrian Negai, footballer